Pedro Henrique "Kiko" Loureiro (born 16 June 1972) is a Brazilian guitarist. He has been a member of several heavy metal bands, including Angra and Megadeth.

Career
Loureiro began studying music and playing acoustic guitar at age 11. He studied with two famous Brazilian musicians: Pedro Bueno and Mozart Mello. Inspired by various artists, including Eddie Van Halen, Jimmy Page, Jimi Hendrix, and Randy Rhoads, he moved to the electric guitar at 13 and by 16 had already joined two bands, Legalize (with Edu Mello on vocals, Dennis Belik on bass and Alja on drums) and A Chave, and was playing in nightclubs in São Paulo. At 19, he co-founded Brazilian power metal band Angra.

Due to the increase in popularity of power metal, Loureiro has become quite successful, both playing in Angra and as a solo artist.

In addition to his rock/metal achievements, Loureiro has also played guitars on several eurobeat songs in collaboration with Dave Rodgers, including "Fevernova", "Ring of Fire" and "The Road Is on Fire".

On 2 April 2015, it was announced that Loureiro had joined the American thrash metal band Megadeth, replacing Chris Broderick.

On 12 February 2017, Loureiro, along with Dave Mustaine, David Ellefson and Chris Adler, won the "Best Metal Performance" Grammy Award for the Megadeth song "Dystopia" at the 59th Grammy Awards.

Musical style
Loureiro is known for his technical skill on the guitar, frequently incorporating such techniques as two handed tapping, sweep picking (full swept arpeggios), alternate picking, hybrid picking, artificial and natural harmonics and combining legato and staccato in the same run or phrase. He is also well known for both his instructional and demonstration videos as well as for writing columns for and appearing on the cover of magazines Cover Guitarra, Guitar & Bass, and Young Guitar.

Despite being a right-handed guitarist, Loureiro is naturally left-handed. As such, he spends most of his pre-warmups focusing on his right-hand techniques.

Personal life

Loureiro married Finnish pianist and keyboardist Maria Ilmoniemi in 2011. The two met during Loureiro's tenure in Tarja Turunen's Storm World Tour in 2008. Their first daughter, Livia, was born on 29 September 2011. On 21 November 2016, they welcomed twins Dante and Stella.

Loureiro is a vegetarian. He has tried being a vegan in the past but he switched to vegetarianism after 6 months.

Discography

Solo
 No Gravity (2005)
 Universo Inverso (2006)
 Fullblast (2009)
 Sounds of Innocence (2012)
 The White Balance (DVD, 2013)
 Open Source (2020)

Video lesson and instructional

 Guitarra Rock (1993)
 Os Melhores Solos e Riffs do Angra (2003) Tecnica e Versatilidade (2003) Guitarra Tecnica Para Iniciantes (2009) Rock Fusion Brasileiro (2009) Creative Fusion (2010)Angra
 Reaching Horizons (originally released in 1992, reissued in 1997)
 Angels Cry (JVC Japan, 1993) Evil Warning EP (1994)
 Holy Land (Gravadora Eldorado, 1996)Make Believe Part 1 single (1996)
 Make Believe Part 2 single (1997)
 Make Believe Part 3 single (1997)
 Make Believe Part 4 single (1997)
 Freedom Call EP (1996)
 Holy Live live EP (1997)
 Fireworks (SPV GmbH/Century Media Records, 1998)Lisbon single (1998)
 Rainy Nights single (1998)
 Rebirth (SPV GmbH/Steamhammer, 2001)Acid Rain single (2001)
 Hunters and Prey EP (SPV GmbH/Steamhammer, 2002)
 Rebirth World Tour – Live in São Paulo live album and video (BMG/Victor Entertainment, recorded in 2001 and released in 2003)
 Temple of Shadows (SPV GmbH/Steamhammer, 2004)Wishing Well single (2004)
 Aurora Consurgens (SPV GmbH/Steamhammer, 2006)The Course of the Nature single (2006)
 Aqua (SPV GmbH/Steamhammer, 2010)Angels Cry 20th Anniversary Tour (JVC/Victor Entertainment, Substantial Music, SPV/Steamhammer, 2013)Secret Garden (JVC, Universal Music, Edel Music, 2014)Ømni  (2018) - guitar solo on "War Horns" as a guest

Tribuzy
 Execution (2005)
 Execution – Live Reunion (2007)

Tarja
 My Winter Storm (2007)
 The Seer (EP) (2008)

Neural Code
 Neural Code (2009)

Paco Ventura
 Black Moon (2015) - On the song "Arabestia"

Megadeth
 Dystopia (2016)
 The Sick, the Dying... and the Dead!'' (2022)

References

External links

 Official Kiko Loureiro website
 Official Angra website

1972 births
Living people
Brazilian heavy metal guitarists
Grammy Award winners
Brazilian male guitarists
Lead guitarists
Angra (band) members
Megadeth members
Musicians from Rio de Janeiro (city)
Progressive metal guitarists
21st-century guitarists
21st-century male musicians